Maxime Courby (born 23 November 1990) is a French professional basketball player for JL Bourg of LNB Pro A.

On 15 June 2011 he signed for three seasons at Antibes Sharks.

On 21 June 2012 he signed up for a season with SPO Rouen.

In January 2013, he suffered a broken nose. On 6 April 2013 he suffered a sprained ankle.

On 24 June 2014 he decided to stay in Rouen and honor his last year of contract.

On 30 May 2015 he signed for two years at JL Bourg.

References 

1990 births
Living people
BCM Gravelines players
French men's basketball players
JL Bourg-en-Bresse players
Olympique Antibes basketball players
Small forwards
Sportspeople from Roubaix